Alice Brickley Hardiman is an Irish actress. She is known for her roles in the BBC series Wreck and the Hallmark movie Christmas at Castle Hart.

Early life and education 
Hardiman was born in Dublin. She studied Modern Languages at University College Dublin and then switched to the Gaiety Theatre.

Career 
Hardiman was listed as one of The Sunday Times "30 under 30 artists set for greater glory" in 2020.  She won the 2022 "Luicille Ball Award for Best Female Actor" at the Dublin International Comedy Film Festival. She was one of the participants in the Creative Team of The 24 Hour Plays in aid of Dublin Youth Theatre. 

She has written several plays including Disconnected, Electric  and Death of Pablo. She performed Electric at the Edinburgh Fringe in 2019 as part of a UK and Ireland tour. She was Chairperson of the Judging Panel of the 2022 Dublin Fringe Festival. She was part of the small cast of "Inside the GPO" play by Colin Murphy as part of the 1916 commemorations.

Hardiman's play Electric is based on the Electric Picnic festival and contrasts the friendship and fate of two girls from different sides of Dublin City who meet at the festival. 

Hardman's recent television and film credits include Wrecked, Christmas at Castle Hart, Season 2 of Finding Joy, The South Westerlies, Blasts from the Past and The Bright Side.

Filmography

Stage

References

External links 

 

Living people
1994 births
21st-century Irish actresses
People educated at the Arts Educational Schools
Actresses from Dublin (city)
Irish television actresses